Kuu is the Finnish word for the Moon. In Finnish mythology it is a Moon goddess. According to the Kalevala, the daughter of the air Ilmatar allowed a teal to lay its egg on her knee as she floated in the abyss. The egg fell and its parts formed the universe: the white of the egg became the Moon, and the yolk the Sun.

See also
 Kuutar
 List of lunar deities

References

External links
 

Finnish goddesses
Lunar goddesses